Ayutthaya Historical Park ( (Pronunciation)) covers the ruins of the old city of Ayutthaya, Phra Nakhon Si Ayutthaya Province, Thailand. The city of Ayutthaya was founded by King Ramathibodi I in 1351, though it is likely to be significantly older, based on evidence showing that the area was already populated during the Mon Dvaravati period. Sources further mention that around 850 AD, the Khmers occupied the area and established a stronghold there, naming it Ayodhya, after one of the holiest Hindu cities in India of the same name. The early history of Ayutthaya is connected to this Khmer settlement. Additionally, Prince Damrong has also attested to the existence of a city named Ayodhya, founded by the Khmers ruling from Lopburi at the point where the three rivers meet. An excavation map shows traces of an ancient baray (water reservoir) close to the southwestern tip of Wat Yai Chai Mongkhon, which could have been built on a former important Khmer temple complex.

The city was captured by the Burmese in 1569. Though not pillaged, it lost "many valuable and artistic objects." It was the capital of the country until its destruction by the Burmese army in 1767.

In 1969, the Fine Arts Department of Thailand began renovations of the ruins, scaling up the project after the site was declared a historical park in 1976. Part of the park was declared a UNESCO World Heritage Site in 1991.

Park sites
 Wat Chaiwatthanaram
 Wat Kasatrathiraj
 Wat Kudi Dao
 Wat Lokayasutharam
 Wat Mahathat
 Wat Phanan Choeng
 Wiharn Phra Mongkhon Bopit
 Wat Phra Ram
 Wat Phra Sri Sanphet
 Wat Ratchaburana, Ayutthaya
 Wat Yai Chai Mongkhon
 Phra Chedi Suriyothai
 Ayutthaya Historical Study Centre
 Japanese village
 Baan Hollanda (Dutch village)
 Wat Phu Khao Thong
 Elephant camp

Gallery

See also
 Ayutthaya Kingdom

Notes

 The city was founded on Friday, the 6th day of the waxing moon of the 5th month, 1893 Buddhist Era, corresponding to Friday, 4 March 1351 Common Era, according to the calculation of the Fine Arts Department of Thailand.

References

External links

 
 Thai Tourism Authority: official Ayutthaya historical park website
 Ayutthaya.net: Ayutthaya Attractions
 UNESCO: Official Ayutthaya website

Historical Park
Historical parks of Thailand
Archaeological sites in Thailand
World Heritage Sites in Thailand
Geography of Phra Nakhon Si Ayutthaya province
Former populated places in Thailand
Buildings and structures in Phra Nakhon Si Ayutthaya province
Tourist attractions in Phra Nakhon Si Ayutthaya province
1976 establishments in Burma
Buildings and structures on the Chao Phraya River